Sons of Angels may refer to:
former name of Crush 40, Japanese band
Sons of Angels (Norwegian band), Norwegian band

See also
Son of Angels